Erumägi Landscape Conservation Area is a nature park in Tartu County, Estonia.

Its area is 40 ha.

The protected area was designated in 2015 to protect   ancient valley and its biodiversity.

References

Nature reserves in Estonia
Geography of Tartu County